The Brady Bunch 35th Anniversary Reunion Special: Still Brady After All These Years is a 2004 American television special hosted by Jenny McCarthy that reunited all the living cast members of the 1969–1974 ABC sitcom The Brady Bunch, who spoke about the shows and answered questions. It aired September 29, 2004 on TV Land.

Host
 Jenny McCarthy

Cast members
 Florence Henderson
 Ann B. Davis
 Barry Williams
 Maureen McCormick
 Christopher Knight
 Eve Plumb
 Mike Lookinland
 Susan Olsen
 Sherwood Schwartz

Awards
 Nominated Daytime Emmy Award for Outstanding Special Class Special 2005

References

External links
 

2004 television specials
2000s American television specials
English-language television shows
Television series reunion specials
The Brady Bunch
TV Land original programming